The Mărcușa (also: Cernat) is a right tributary of the Râul Negru in Romania. It flows into the Râul Negru between the villages Mărcușa and Surcea.

Tributaries

The following rivers are tributaries to the river Mărcușa (from source to mouth):

Left: Lunca (Retiul)
Right: Pârâul Întunecat, Groapa Pietroasă, Pârâul Rupt, Bortofălău, Pârâul Mic, Albiș

References

Rivers of Romania
Rivers of Covasna County